The Education Achievement Authority (EAA or Authority) was the governing body of the Education Achievement System (EAS or System), a Michigan statewide school system for failing schools. It was discontinued in 2017 and the schools were returned to the Detroit Public Schools.

The office of the State Superintendent or an Emergency Manager of a school district may transfer a failing school from its district into the System that is not under an approved redesign plan.

History
Michigan Governor Rick Snyder created the authority in June 2011 to take over and turn around failing schools.

On August 26, 2011, the EAA Executive Committee went into executive session to discuss hiring John Covington as chancellor.  In the summer of 2011, John Covington was appointed chancellor of the Authority school system.  Pursuant to a complaint, on October 28 Judge Robert Colombo ruled them in violation of Open Meetings Act for failing to have a 2/3 vote to enter the executive session of August 26.

Curt Guyette of the Metro Times wrote that "The EAA has been mired in controversy since its inception. "

In December 2011, Covington held meetings in the Detroit area to explain the Authority, take input about system including whether the EAA should start with more than Detroit Public Schools.

The Authority began taking over Detroit schools in September 2012.
Covington resigned as chancellor on July 13, 2014, with an interim, Veronica Conforme, appointed the next day. After the last remaining candidate dropped out on November 4, 2014, Conforme was named chancellor the next day.

By 2014 many students who formerly went to EAA schools moved back to Detroit Public Schools (DPS) campuses, and the EAA campuses had significant declines in enrollment. Veronica Conforme, the EAA chancellor, announced that she will give autonomy to individual campuses in an effort to improve the academics and public image of the EAA.

In December 2014 Eastern Michigan University put the EAA on notice, asking it to improve.

As of 2015 the EAA did not spend a $11.5 million federal grant it received as part of the Teacher Incentive Fund (TIF).

In February 2016 the Eastern Michigan University Board of Regents submitted notice to withdraw from the Achievement Authority in June 2017. Following the notice Michigan Senate leaders announced they would be working to dismantle the EAA as part of a Detroit Public Schools support package.

Operations

The EAA students used Buzz, an educational software program developed by Agilix Labs that had its testing phases during the EAA instruction. The program used software made by the School Improvement Network (SINET).

As of 2012, 25% of the teachers were from Teach for America.

Schools
 the following schools are controlled by the EAA:

Elementary and middle schools:
 Mary M. Bethune Elementary/Middle School 
 Burns Elementary/Middle School
 Law Academy
 Nolan Elementary/Middle School
 Phoenix Elementary/Middle School
 Brenda Scott Elementary/Middle School

High schools:
 Central Collegiate Academy
 Denby High School
 Henry Ford High School
 Mumford High School
 Pershing High School
 Southeastern High School

Charter schools:
 Murphy Performance Academy
 Stewart Performance Academy
 Trix Performance Academy

Authority Board
as of 2011

See also
Financial emergency in Michigan

References

Education in Michigan
Eastern Michigan University
School districts in Michigan
Public Schools
2011 establishments in Michigan
School districts established in 2011